Juan Manuel Ramos Pintos (born 1 September 1996) is a Uruguayan professional footballer who plays as a defender for Uruguayan Primera División side Peñarol.

Club career

Catania
Born in Montevideo, Ramos joined Sicilian club Catania in January 2014 from Uruguayan side Montevideo Wanderers. He made his league debut for the Rossazzurri on 24 December 2014 against Cittadella in a 3–2 away defeat. He was handed the number 33 shirt for his first season with Catania. Ramos made his second ever appearance in a Catania shirt, when he replaced Andrea De Rossi in the 77th minute of Catania's 3–0 victory over SPAL in round two of the Coppa Italia. SPAL were leading by a single goal scored by ex-Milan player Gianmarco Zigoni with the match being decided by the Football Association. He enjoyed a fruitful  2014–15 season with the Catania Primavera side, managing a total of 16 appearances as Catania finished in 6th place narrowly missing out on the play-offs spot by goal difference behind Empoli's Primavera side. In the 2015–16 close season, Ramos departed the Elefanti, having spent two seasons with the club.

Casertana
On 27 July 2016, he along with fellow new signings Filippo Lorenzini and Lorenzo Colli were unveiled as Casertana players. Though he did not play, on 31 July, Ramos appeared as an unused substitute for Casertana in their 3–2 home win over Tuttocuoio in the 2016–17 Coppa Italia. He scored his first league goal in a 2–1 away victory against Cosenza on 6 November 2016.

Parma
On 7 July 2017, Ramos joined Parma on a permanent deal from Casertana. He signed a three-year contract with the club.

Loan to Cosenza
Having failed to make a single appearance for Parma, on 30 January 2018, Ramos joined Cosenza on a short-term loan. He managed a total of 10 appearances, before returning to his parent club.

Loan to Trapani
Following his loan spell with Cosenza, Ramos was not viewed as a part of Parma's plans for their top-flight return, and was sent out on loan to another Serie C side, this time to Trapani for the 2018–19 season. On 18 August 2018, he made his league debut for the Sicilian club on the opening day of the season, starting in a 3–0 home win against Reggina at the Stadio Polisportivo Provinciale. Ramos was again included in Trapani's starting lineup for Gameweek 2's away fixture against Vibonese. Trapani won the match by two goals to nil. He also started the third game against Sicula Leonzio. Ramos marked his fourth appearance for the side with a goal against Siracusa to help his team to a 2–1 victory and make it four league wins from four games for Trapani.

Spezia
On 4 July 2019, Ramos signed for Serie B club Spezia Calcio.

Personal life
On 21 March 2021 he tested positive for COVID-19.

References

External links
 
 

1996 births
Living people
People from Montevideo
Footballers from Montevideo
Association football fullbacks
Uruguayan footballers
Montevideo Wanderers F.C. players
Catania S.S.D. players
Casertana F.C. players
Parma Calcio 1913 players
Cosenza Calcio players
Trapani Calcio players
Spezia Calcio players
Peñarol players
Serie A players
Serie B players
Serie C players
Uruguayan Primera División players
Uruguayan expatriate footballers
Uruguayan expatriate sportspeople in Italy
Expatriate footballers in Italy